Central House may refer to:

Central House (Central, Alaska), listed on the NRHP in Alaska 
Central House (Orangeville, Illinois), listed on the NRHP in Illinois 
Central House (Napoleon, Indiana), listed on the NRHP in Indiana

See also
Central House Hotel, Boscobel, Wisconsin, listed on the NRHP in Wisconsin